Itawamba County is a county located in the U.S. state of Mississippi. As of the 2020 United States Census, the population was 23,863. Its county seat is Fulton. The county is part of the Tupelo, MS Micropolitan Statistical Area.

The county was named for the Chickasaw leader Itawamba, known to English-speaking settlers as Levi Colbert. He was prominent during the Indian Removal period of the early 19th century, but died before his people left the area.

Geography

Major highways

  Interstate 22
  U.S. Highway 78
  Mississippi Highway 23 
  Mississippi Highway 25
 Natchez Trace Parkway

Adjacent counties

 Tishomingo County - northeast
 Franklin County, Alabama - east
 Marion County, Alabama - southeast
 Monroe County - south
 Lee County - west
 Prentiss County - northwest

National protected area
 Natchez Trace Parkway (part)
 Pharr Mounds (near Tupelo),  complex of earthwork burial mounds from the Middle Woodland period

Demographics

2020 census

As of the 2020 United States census, there were 23,863 people, 8,653 households, and 6,207 families residing in the county.

2000 census
As of the 2000 United States Census, there were 22,770 people, 8,773 households, and 6,500 families in the county. The population density was 43 people per square mile (17/km2). There were 9,804 housing units at an average density of 18 per square mile (7/km2). The racial makeup of the county was 92.47% White, 6.47% Black or African American, 0.14% Native American, 0.18% Asian, 0.32% from other races, and 0.42% from two or more races. 0.99% of the population were Hispanic or Latino of any race.

In 2000, there were 8,773 households, out of which 33.20% had children under the age of 18 living with them, 60.30% were married couples living together, 9.90% had a female householder with no husband present, and 25.90% were non-families. 23.40% of all households were made up of individuals, and 11.10% had someone living alone who was 65 years of age or older. The average household size was 2.51 and the average family size was 2.95.

The county population contained 24.20% under the age of 18, 10.60% from 18 to 24, 27.80% from 25 to 44, 23.20% from 45 to 64, and 14.20% who were 65 years of age or older. The median age was 36 years. For every 100 females, there were 94.10 males. For every 100 females age 18 and over, there were 92.50 males.

The median income for a household in the county was $31,156, and the median income for a family was $36,793. Males had a median income of $29,231 versus $20,900 for females. The per capita income for the county was $14,956.  About 10.10% of families and 14.00% of the population were below the poverty line, including 15.70% of those under age 18 and 23.60% of those age 65 or over.

Communities

City
 Fulton (county seat)

Towns
 Mantachie
 Tremont

Census-designated place
 Kirkville

Unincorporated communities

 Beans Ferry
 Bounds Crossroads
 Cadamy
 Carolina
 Clay
 Dorsey
 Tilden
 Turon

Ghost towns

 Rara Avis
 Ryan's Well
 Van Buren
 Wheeling
 Yale

Notable people
 Brian Dozier, All-Star Major League Baseball second baseman, won 2019 World Series with the Washington Nationals
 Delphia Spencer Hankins, American supercentenarian
 John E. Rankin, sixteen-term Democratic U.S. Congressman (1920–1952)
 Tammy Wynette, American country music artist

Politics

Civil Rights
The County holds an annual Civil Rights march and speaker series in January on/around the celebration of MLK day. MLK Day Celebration  
The county was the site of the 2010 Itawamba County School District prom controversy when a lesbian student, Constance McMillen, from Fulton, had 
attempted to bring her partner to prom. The matter went to court, with the ACLU representing McMillen. On July 20, 2010, the school district settled the case out of court by paying McMillen US$ 35,000 (equivalent to $41,537 in 2020), paying her attorneys' fees, and agreeing to create a non-discrimination policy that includes sexual orientation.

See also

 List of counties in Mississippi
 National Register of Historic Places listings in Itawamba County, Mississippi

References

External links

 
 Itawamba Historical Society
 Lee-Itawamba Library System

 
1836 establishments in Mississippi
Mississippi placenames of Native American origin
Counties of Appalachia

Mississippi counties
Populated places established in 1836
Tupelo micropolitan area